Kari Angelique Jaquesson (born 12 April 1962) is a Norwegian conspiracy theorist, author, fitness consultant and former television personality. She writes for the conspiracy theorist website Steigan.no and has been widely criticized for promoting climate change denial, COVID-19 misinformation, Russian propaganda, Antisemitism and transphobia. A 2021 survey by YouGov found that the public figures viewed most negatively by Norwegians were Donald Trump, Kari Jaquesson and Vladimir Putin.

Fitness and television career
Kari Jaquesson is an aerobics instructor and became widely known in Norway in the 1990s for hosting a daytime workout program on TV2. She has also written books about fitness. She was named a Goodwill Ambassador for the United Nations Population Fund in 2000 to raise awareness about fitness and public health.

Views
From the 2010s Jaquesson has become known for promoting a number of conspiracy theories, including climate change denial, COVID-19 misinformation and Russian propaganda related to the 2022 Russian invasion of Ukraine.

Jews and Israel

In 2015 Jaquesson implied that Israel supported ISIS, and was criticized by the Norwegian Humanist Association and other critics of promoting Antisemitic conspiracy theories.

Syria
Jaquesson is a long-time supporter of Bashar al-Assad. John Færseth argued that Jaquesson painted a picture of "a grand, international conspiracy against a popular Assad regime."

Views on gender
Jaquesson is a self-described TERF and has said that "a man cannot become a woman." She is active in the Women's Declaration International anti-transgender group. She has also been active in the radical feminist Feminist Group Ottar and has often caused controversy as a representative of that group; in 2016, she told a 17-year girl to "suck dick ten times a day". The controversy regarded the legalization of prostitution, and the sucking was proposed to picture the unpleasant daily life of a prostitute.

COVID-19 misinformation

From 2020 Jaquesson has actively promoted COVID-19 misinformation. She claimed there was no pandemic and ridiculed the public health measures, such as the use of masks.

Russia
Jaquesson supports the 2022 Russian invasion of Ukraine. She is a contributor to and a co-owner of the website Steigan.no that promotes Russian propaganda.

Bibliography 
 Det gode liv, LibriArte, 1999
 Hurra, jeg er gravid: trim og kosthold for nybakte mødre, Cappelen, 2000
 10 minutter til en sprekere kropp, 2004
 10 minutter til en sterkere rygg og litt flatere mage, 2007
 10 minutter til fastere lår og en litt mer spretten rumpe, 2008
 Ketsjup er ålreit, 2009
 Kropp på topp! : på 10 minutter : lår og rumpe, armer og overkropp, rygg og mage, 2010
 Det første steget til en sprekere kropp, 2012
 Sunnere hverdagsmat, 2012

References 

Norwegian conspiracy theorists
1962 births
Living people
Norwegian non-fiction writers
Norwegian women non-fiction writers